The 2020 MSBL season was to be the 32nd season of the Men's State Basketball League (SBL). The regular season was set to begin on Saturday 14 March, but due to the coronavirus pandemic, the season was cancelled.

Season that was scheduled
After two weekends of pre-season games (the first for regional teams and the second for metro teams), the regular season was set to begin on Saturday 14 March and end on Saturday 25 July after 20 rounds of competition. A small-scale round 1 was scheduled to open the season, with the Goldfields Giants playing away to the Geraldton Buccaneers and Cockburn Cougars. A full round of fixtured games in round 2 was then scheduled for the remaining teams to make their season debuts. In continuing tradition, there was to be Easter Round (5), Anzac Round (6), Women's Round (9), Heritage Round (13), and Mental Health Awareness Round (18). The finals was then scheduled to take place between Friday 31 July and Saturday 22 August, concluding with the MSBL Grand Final. Under a revised finals model, the finals was to take place across four weekends instead of five to better align with the NBL1 format.

In the wake of the coronavirus outbreak in Australia in early to mid March 2020, the season was suspended indefinitely with no games having taken place. On 14 May 2020, the season was officially cancelled due to the ongoing pandemic.

West Coast Classic
To fill the void of a cancelled SBL season, a state amateur competition known as the West Coast Classic was announced on 12 June 2020. Presented by Basketball WA, all 14 Men's SBL teams competed in the 10-week competition. The competition began on Friday 24 July and had all teams playing each other once in a home and away fixture. The top four teams following the regular season competed in the finals, with semi-finals on Friday 25 September and the grand final on Sunday 27 September.

The Warwick Senators finished atop the regular-season standings with a 12–1 record. The semi-finals featured the Senators against the fourth-seeded Lakeside Lightning and the second-seeded Perry Lakes Hawks against the third-seeded Joondalup Wolves, with the Senators defeating the Lightning 92–84 and the Hawks defeating the Wolves 96–70. In the grand final, the Senators defeated the Hawks 96–81 behind 15 points, six rebounds and six assists from game MVP Corban Wroe.

References

External links
 2020 fixtures
 Season preview
 Rockingham Flames 2020 season magazine
 2020 WCC Review and Grand Final Preview
 2020 WCC Grand Final replay

2020
2019–20 in Australian basketball
2020–21 in Australian basketball